Selca (in older sources also Selce) is a village in the Municipality of Železniki in the Upper Carniola region of Slovenia.

History
It is an old settlement, first mentioned in 973 AD, and was formerly the main settlement and center for the entire Selca Valley, which was named after the village. Only in more recent times did Železniki become the administrative center for the area.

Churches

The Baroque parish church in Selca is dedicated to Saint Peter. It belongs to the Archdiocese of Ljubljana. A second church, built just outside the village at the cemetery, is dedicated to the Feast of the Cross.

References

External links

Selca at Geopedia

Populated places in the Municipality of Železniki